Ajith Bandara is a Sri Lankan singer. He is the winner of the first season of the singing reality competition Sirasa Superstar in 2006.

Personal life
He is from Ahasyanapitiya,  Mawathagama, in Kurunegala District and the second child of his family. His father, who was a carpenter, died after a chest pain when he was a teenager. He has two brothers and three sisters. Before entering singing, he worked as a woodcarver and polisher at Bandara Weerakone Furnishers at Mawathagama. He completed his education at Pothubowa Vidyalaya in Mawathagama.

He is married to Niluka Bandara and they have two children. His daughter, Sathsari Chanchala, became the champion of the reality show Hiru Super Hero in 2017.

Singing career
He started singing at a young age., but his poor family status kept him away from popular singing. Then he joined a group called Flowers. In 2005, his wife sent an application for Sirasa Superstar, Sri Lanka's first singing reality competition. His first audition was in Habarana. He gradually moved through the competition and eventually was the winner. He received one million LKR, a prize car and free sponsorship for a first album. Soon after winning the competition, he released his first music album, Thilaka Thiyanna, which was launched at the Sugathadasa Indoor Stadium in Colombo.

After the competition, he had several popular hits, including "Sudu Hansiye", "Duwillen Thilaka Thiyanna", "Oba Innawanam", "Seetha Handekare" and "Aradhanawak Kalado". He made a duet, "Bandara Aiye", with Shanika Madumali, the season 3 winner of Sirasa Superstar. In 2017, he released the solo "Mage Santhake". In 2018, he released the song "Heena Yaya Pura" after a year silence.

Thilaka Thiyanna
Track listing

References

21st-century Sri Lankan male singers
Living people
Sinhalese singers
Year of birth missing (living people)